The Forest Marble is a geological formation in England. Part of the Great Oolite Group, it dates to the late Bathonian stage of the Middle Jurassic.

Lithology 
The primary lithology of the formation typically consists of greenish grey variably calcareous silicate mudstone, with lenticular cross bedded limestone units deposited in a marine setting.

Dinosaurian fauna

Ornithischians

Saurischians

Microvertebrate fauna 
Despite the formation being nearly entirely marine, at several localities abundant remains of terrestrial microvertebrates are found, the primary locality being the Kirtlington Mammal Bed (designated 3p) in Kirtlington Quarry near Kirtlington, Oxfordshire. Another important locality is Watton Cliff near Eype in Dorset.

Amphibians

Turtles

Choristoderes

Lepidosauromorphs

Crocodyliformes

Mammaliamorphs

See also

 List of dinosaur-bearing rock formations
 Bradford Clay

Footnotes

References
 Weishampel, David B.; Dodson, Peter; and Osmólska, Halszka (eds.): The Dinosauria, 2nd, Berkeley: University of California Press. 861 pp. .

Geologic formations of England
Middle Jurassic Europe
Jurassic England
Bathonian Stage
Jurassic System of Europe